Carnivals in the Basque Country are celebrated in eleven different villages and cities and they are usually lively and colourful celebrations. This way of celebrating carnivals has attracted attention all over Europe. They are associated with the old tradition of the Basque Country and they have been celebrated in different ways since the age of the Roman Empire. Each village or city has a typical character and all the celebrations are associated with this character.
They have had a lot of changes during the years in the costumes, rituals, meanings and ways to celebrate them. They have been also denounced several times, for example by Franco's dictatorship. But they always have been a very important part of the basque culture and it is also a symbol of it.

Main characters

Markitos
This character is from Zalduondo (Alava). He is a doll dressed with a black suit and a tie. The Sunday of carnivals, he appears in the main street of the village riding a donkey and they take them to a castle. Here, they take him down from the donkey and they hang him from a six-meters stick for some hours.
In the afternoon, a noisy procession appears. Here the preacher and the street cleaner come in the leading position. Then an old couple appears. These are the parents of Markitos, and a single person does the characters of both of them. And after them, other different characters. The last ones take Markitos down, and they put him in a cart.
They drive this cart to a court wall and here the preacher judges Markitos. He says that he has to be killed, so people take the doll and they burn him.

Kotilungorriak
This character is typical from Uztaritz. The celebration lasts four days. The first three days, people dressed up as different characters, go home to home asking and there are also some parades during these three days. On these parades appears different characters like Kaskarot, Ponpiera and Kotilungorria. This last one is the most important one. Normally, there vare only two. They wear a red skirt over some white trousers. They wear also a white jacket and a typical apron. On their hands they wear a stick with a cow tail hanged. On their head, they wear a long pyramidal hut and their face is covered by a red clothing. This characters is usually scaring children.

Atorrak
They are a group of men and boys from Mundaka who go out to the street on the Sunday of Carnivals and they play music and they sing. They dressed white clothes, except the director of the band. Every year, they compose a new song and after going around all the village, they go to the harbor. This is the best part of their show.

Joaldunak
The Joaldunak are the protagonists from the Ituren and Zubieta carnivals in Navarre which are held on the Monday and Tuesday after the last Sunday in January. One of the notable characteristics of the Joaldunak is that they wear a pair of large cow bells tied tightly around their waist which they ring in a loud, rhythmic and atavistic dirge. They also wear a tall conical hat with coloured ribbons and a thick sheepskin over their shoulders. In their hands they hold a horse hair whip which they flick in front of them as they march.
On the Monday of carnivals, a troupe of Joaldunak from Zubieta, visit the village of Ituren where they are greeted by the locals who are dressed up as witches and demons. There is then a grand feast in Ituren village hall. On the Tuesday morning a troupe of Joaldunak from Ituren then march over to Zubieta where they are greeted by the villagers of Zubieta who are also dressed as demons and witches. Afterwards there is a large feast in Ituren village hall. The Joaldunak and the carnivals in Ituren and Zubieta have attracted much anthropological interest and some argue that they are the oldest pagan, pre-indoeuropean carnivals in Europe.

Zalmantzain
This is the protagonist of the dance of the Maskarada from Zuberoa, which lasts from the start of the carnivals and end on Tuesday. They celebrate it doing a show. In this shoe there are two different groups: the black ones and the red ones. The red ones are the characters that are elegantly and cleanly dressed (we can find Zalmantzain in this group). And the black ones are dressed as poor people. During the procession along the village, the black ones tried to annoy the red ones. When they arrive to the main square the red ones dance typical basque dances.

Miel Otxin

This is one of the principal characters of the carnivals on Monday and Tuesday in Lantz. With him, other ones appear like: Ziripot, Zaldiko and Txatxoa.
Miel Otxin is a three-meter-tall doll made of straw. A Txatxo take him on his shoulders during the celebrations. Zaldiko is a centaur, a man dressed up as a horse. The Txatxos have different ways of dressing up. But they are always colorful and they wear a broom in their hands, their face covered and a colorful conical hut. The celebration starts on Monday. All this characters go out to the street. The Txatxos go around singing and dancing. Zaldiko tries to throw Ziripot and this one falls several times because he is a little bit clumsy. On Tuesday, the only character that goes out is Miel Otxin. The Txatxos carry him to the main square and here they judge him. They shoot him twice and they kill him. After that, they cut his body into pieces and they burn him.

References

Euskalherriko Inauteriak 

Basque culture
Carnivals in Europe